Walter T. Gwenigale ( 1935April 22, 2022) was a Liberian politician who became Minister of Health and Social Welfare in the Cabinet of Liberia in 2006. Gwenigale was born in the Central Province, which later became known as Bong County. He completed a BA in Chemistry from the Interamerican University of Puerto Rico in 1963, and a Doctor of Medicine from the University of Puerto Rico School of Medicine. 

Gwenigale died on April 22, 2022, in John F. Kennedy Medical Center.

References

1930s births
2022 deaths
Health ministers of Liberia
Interamerican University of Puerto Rico alumni
University of Puerto Rico School of Medicine alumni
21st-century Liberian politicians
People from Bong County